Hellbound is the third studio album by German speed metal band Iron Angel, released on 4 May 2018 by Mighty Music. It is the band's first album since 1986's Winds of War, and the first to feature a brand new line-up assembled by vocalist Dirk Schröder. A music video was made for "Ministry of Metal". A promo video was made for "Blood and Leather".

Track listing

Personnel
Dirk Schröder – vocals
Robert Altenbach – guitars
Mitsch Meyer – guitars
Didy Mackel – bass
Maximilian Behr – drums

Guest musician
 Hilke Braun – backing vocals

Production
Michael Hahn – mixing, producer, mastering
Andreas Libera – engineering

References

2018 albums
Iron Angel albums
Mighty Music albums